This article concerns the period 69 BC – 60 BC.

Significant people
 Pompey, Roman general, (lived 106 BC–48 BC)
 Mithridates VI, King of Pontus, (lived 132 BC–63 BC)
 Philip II Philoromaeus
 Gaius Antonius Hybrida, elected praetor in 66 BC
 Cleopatra VII is born (69 BC–30 BC) and grows into a young girl passing age 9.

Citations

References